The individual show jumping at the 1984 Summer Olympics took place on 12 August at the Santa Anita Racetrack. The event was open to both men and women. There were 51 competitors from 21 nations. The event was won by Joseph Fargis of the United States, the nation's first victory in individual jumping since 1968 and second overall, third-most all-time behind France and Italy with 3. His teammate Conrad Homfeld earned silver. Heidi Robbiani earned Switzerland's first medal in the event since 1928 with her bronze.

Background

This was the 17th appearance of the event, which had first been held at the 1900 Summer Olympics and has been held at every Summer Olympics at which equestrian sports have been featured (that is, excluding 1896, 1904, and 1908). It is the oldest event on the current programme, the only one that was held in 1900. The team and individual events remained separated, as they had been starting in 1968.

Due to the American-led boycott in 1980 and the Soviet-led boycott in 1984, only fourth-place finisher Oswaldo Méndez of Guatemala returned from the 1980 Games. The favorite was 1982 World Cup winner Melanie Smith, leading an unusually strong American team.

No nations made their debut in the event. France competed for the 15th time, most of any nation.

Competition format

The competition used the two-round format introduced in 1952. The elimination feature added in 1968 returned after not being used in 1980 due to a small field; the number of riders advancing from the first round to the second was increased to 25 from 20 (the number of advancing riders in 1972 and 1976). Both rounds were combined to determine placement. Ties for medal positions would be broken through a jump-off.

Schedule

All times are Pacific Daylight Time (UTC-7)

Results

References

Equestrian at the 1984 Summer Olympics